Split is an outdoor 2003 stainless steel sculpture by Roxy Paine, installed at Olympic Sculpture Park in the neighborhood of Belltown in Seattle, Washington.

The sculpture is a life-sized steel representation of a tree without any leaves. Naturally, birds such as crows can be seen occasionally resting on the branches. It was built in a way that the two main branches diverge in direction, making it look more natural. It is approximately 15.24 m (50 ft) tall.

References

2003 sculptures
Olympic Sculpture Park
Stainless steel sculptures in Washington (state)